Portrait of the Artist is an 1878 self-portrait painting  by Mary Cassatt. It is in the collection of the Metropolitan Museum of Art, New York.

Early history and creation
According to the Metropolitan Museum of Art, he painting is a "watercolour, gouache on wove paper laid down to buff-colored wood-pulp paper". It is now in the public domain.

References

Created via preloaddraft
Metropolitan Museum of Art 2017 drafts
Paintings in the collection of the Metropolitan Museum of Art